is a Japanese football player who plays for Blaublitz Akita.

National team career
In June 2005, Matsui was selected Japan U-20 national team for 2005 World Youth Championship. But he did not play in the match, as he was the team's reserve goalkeeper behind Shusaku Nishikawa.

Club statistics

1Includes Promotion Playoffs to J1.

References

External links

 

Profile at Omiya Ardija
Profile at Mito HollyHock

1985 births
Living people
Association football people from Shizuoka Prefecture
Japanese footballers
J1 League players
J2 League players
Júbilo Iwata players
Kyoto Sanga FC players
Cerezo Osaka players
Tokushima Vortis players
Kawasaki Frontale players
Omiya Ardija players
Mito HollyHock players
Blaublitz Akita players
Footballers at the 2006 Asian Games
Association football goalkeepers
Asian Games competitors for Japan
People from Kakegawa, Shizuoka